Daniel Phineas Woodbury (December 16, 1812 – August 15, 1864) was an American soldier and an engineer during the American Civil War.

Birth and early years
Woodbury was born at New London, New Hampshire.  He graduated at West Point in 1836, entered the artillery as a second lieutenant, and until 1840 served as assistant engineer in building the Cumberland Road.  He superintended the construction of Forts Kearney and Laramie (1847–50), but in 1851 he was recalled to the East. He published works on Sustaining Walls (1845) and the Theory of the Arch (1858).

Woodbury supervised construction of Fort Jefferson and the Dry Tortugas Light.

Civil War
In 1861 he was appointed to be major of engineers and lieutenant colonel on the staff.  He fought at the First Battle of Bull Run, afterward was engaged until 1862 upon the defenses of Washington, D.C..  He then commanded the Engineer Brigade during the Peninsula Campaign and the Northern Virginia Campaign, as well as during the Battle of Antietam.  At Fredericksburg, he earned the brevet of brigadier general in the regular army for his efforts in supervising the construction of several pontoon bridges across the Rappahannock River.  From December 1862 to March 1863, he participated in the Rappahannock campaign. Later in 1863 he was commandant of the district of Key West and the Tortugas, where he died of yellow fever August 15, 1864.

A monument to Woodbury is at Oak Hill Cemetery in Washington, D.C.

See also

List of American Civil War generals (Union)

References

People of New Hampshire in the American Civil War
United States Military Academy alumni
Union Army generals
1812 births
1864 deaths
Deaths from yellow fever
Infectious disease deaths in Florida
People from New London, New Hampshire
Burials at Barrancas National Cemetery
Burials at Oak Hill Cemetery (Washington, D.C.) 
Union military personnel killed in the American Civil War